Darren Brass is an American tattoo artist and television personality.  He was featured in the reality television show Miami Ink.

Information
Darren Brass cites Chris Garver, Joe Vegas, Bob Roberts, and Ed Hardy as influences. In the year of 2010, Brass co-founded a children's clothing and product label called Ruthless & Toothless. Darren Brass has been in the tattoo business for about 25 years now. Brass moved from Waterbury, Connecticut to Miami so that he could possibly further his career as a tattoo artist. Brass uses his role in Miami Ink in the LoveHate Parlour to showcase his artwork and hopefully gain clientele. While working in the Miami Ink shop, he constantly is being messed with because he has a nice attitude and charm that hides beneath his rough exterior.

Background
Darren Brass's whole name is Darren Collarado Brass.  He was born in 1972, and began his career when one of his friends introduced him to tattooing. Brass suffers from diabetes and has to take due precaution while working. He is 5 foot 4 inches and is covered in bright and colorful tattoos. He is married and has a little dog that he is known to treat like his child. Brass received his first tattoo when he turned 18 years old. It has been said that his sweet demeanor makes a majority of first time clients more at ease and less nervous. Brass is commonly mistaken to be from the Latin descent, but he is actually half Irish and half Polish.

References

External links
Darren Brass on Love Hate Tattoos

1972 births
American tattoo artists
American television personalities
Living people
Place of birth missing (living people)
People with type 1 diabetes